The Cape Corps and its predecessor units were the main military organisations in which the Coloured members of South Africa's population served.

History

As one of the military units of South Africa with one of the longest histories, the Cape Corps reflects the history of South Africa's Coloured population to a great extent.

1781–1782 

The first Coloured unit to be formed was the Corps Bastaard Hottentoten (Afrikaans: "Corps of Bastard Hottentots"), which was organised in 1781 by the Dutch colonial administration of the time. Based in Cape Town and drawing its members from men of mixed Hottentot and White ancestry, this unit had about 400 members under the command of Hendrik Eksteen and Gerrit Munnik. The unit was disbanded in 1782 when French mercenaries arrived in the Cape.

1793–1870 

In 1793 this unit was re-formed in Cape Town as the Corps van Pandoeren (Pandour Corps) with 200 men under the command of Captain Jan Cloete, only to be disbanded again in 1795.

The unit was re-formed again under the British colonial administration in May 1796, this time under the name Hottentot Corps. It was headquartered in Wynberg and consisted of about 300 men. In 1798 the headquarters were moved to Hout Bay.

On 25 June 1801 the Cape Regiment was formed. It was organised as a British imperial regiment of ten companies and retained all the personnel of the Hottentot Corps.

With the Dutch taking over colonial administration of the Cape once again, the Corps Vrye Hottentotten ("Corps of Free Hottentots") was formed on 21 February 1803. It was later renamed the Hottentot Ligte Infanterie ("Hottentot Light Infantry").

When the British returned to the Cape, they formed The Cape Regiment in October 1806. Headquartered in Cape Town, it was organised as a typical colonial unit with British officers and Coloured other ranks. In later years, the Regiment also had a troop of light cavalry added.

On 24 September 1817 the Regiment was reduced in size (a previous order to completely disband having either been ignored or rescinded) to two small units of about 200 men for the defence of the Cape Colony's eastern frontier. The two units were named the Cape Cavalry (consisting of one troop of dragoons) and the Cape Light Infantry. Mathew Richmond, coming from the Royal Military College, joined them in 1817.

In 1820 these two units were again combined under a unified command and renamed the Cape Corps. The Cape Mounted Riflemen (Imperial) were formed on 25 November 1827; the cavalry wing was disbanded and the Corps reorganised as battalion of mounted infantry.

In 1850 some soldiers effectively mutinied by joining Coloured rebellion in the eastern Cape; the regiment was subsequently reconstituted as mixed unit with both White and Coloured members. Some years later, in 1854, the recruitment of Coloured members for the battalion was completely halted.

The battalion was completely disbanded in 1870 when military service was abolished for Coloureds, although its name and traditions were appropriated in 1878 by another (all-White) Cape Mounted Riflemen.

1915–1918

As part of South Africa's efforts for World War I, the Cape Corps was re-formed in the Cape Province by Sir Walter Stanford, as a single battalion in December 1915 as part of the Union Defence Force. In 1916 the Corps was expanded and a second battalion raised. The original battalion was redesignated the 1st Battalion and the new unit (which was disbanded in 1918) as the 2nd Battalion.

1940–1950 

In order to provide additional troops for South Africa's participation in World War II, the Cape Corps was reconstituted again on 8 May 1940, partly from the Association of the 1915-1918 Corps.

This unit was assigned the role of a non-combatant service corps with a pioneer battalion and five motor transport companies. It was later expanded to include several motorised infantry battalions, infantry battalions, prisoner of war (POW) guard battalions and POW escort battalions. At its peak strength, the Corps had about 23,000 members. On 13 October 1942 the Corps absorbed the South African Indian and Malay Corps but was disbanded at the end of hostilities in 1945.

In 1947 the Cape Corps was reconstituted as a Permanent Force Coloured service corps only to be disbanded in 1950 by the newly elected National Party, which abolished military service for Coloureds.

1963–1991 

The Cape Corps was reformed again in 1963, as a non-combatant Coloured service corps; it was considered to be the successor to all the previous Coloured and Cape Corps units since 1796. The Corps was designated a Permanent Force unit of the South African Defence Force in 1972.
 
In 1973 the unit was renamed the South African Cape Corps Service Battalion. When the South African Defence Act was amended in 1975 to give Coloureds "equivalent status to whites" in the South African Army, the battalion was renamed the South African Cape Corps Battalion, its combatant status was restored and the first Coloured officers were commissioned.

During the period 1979 to 1989 the South African Cape Corps (SACC) was substantially expanded:
 The SACC Maintenance Unit was formed in 1979 from some of the members of the original service battalion.
 The original combat battalion was renamed 1st Battalion when the 2nd Battalion was raised in December 1984.
 The 3rd Battalion was raised in Kimberley in 1989.
 The SACC School and SACC School for Junior Leaders were founded.

In 1990 the SACC was reduced to a single battalion and redesignated 9 South African Infantry Battalion which was reroled as a seaborne light infantry unit.
Currently, as a result of the post-1994 transformation of South Africa, Coloured soldiers, sailors and airmen serve alongside their fellow South Africans in a fully integrated South African National Defence Force.

Corps symbols
 Corps badge: Although there were numerous variants, the Corps badges of the 1915 - 1991 era all consisted of the Crest of the Arms of the Cape of Good Hope Colony, i.e. the figure of Hope with her left hand resting on an anchor and her right hand or elbow resting on Table Mountain, with an inscribed scroll below. During 1915 to 1945 the inscription read "CAPE CORPS", while during 1963 to 1991 it read "FORTITER ET FIDELITER". The figure of Hope also appeared on the gorgets of the Dutch Cape regiments up to 1795.
 Corps motto: Fortiter et fideliter (Bravely and faithfully) (1963–1991).

Battle honours
 Awarded to the Cape Mounted Riflemen:
 Cape of Good Hope (awarded in 1841 for service in the Fourth, Fifth and Sixth Kaffir Wars).

 Awarded to the 1915 Cape Corps:
 Kilimanjaro
 Behobeho
 Nyangao
 East Africa 1916-1917
 East Africa 1917-1918
 Megiddo 1918
 Nablus
 Palestine 1918

The 1915 Cape Corps did not inherit the battle honour of the Cape Mounted Riflemen.

Operations 
The Cape Corps' most famous combat operation is the Battle of Square Hill which took place in what was then known as Palestine on 16, 17 and 18 September 1918. It was this battle in particular which earned the Cape Corps its combat reputation and for which the Palestine 1918 Battle Honour was awarded. 

While known as the  this unit served regularly in Namibia during the South African Border War.

See also
 Military history of South Africa

References

Military units and formations established in 1781
Infantry regiments of South Africa
Disbanded military units and formations in Cape Town
Military units and formations of the British Empire
Military units and formations of South Africa in the Border War
Military units and formations of South Africa in World War I
Military units and formations of the British Empire in World War II
Military units and formations disestablished in 1991
Pages with Battle Honours